Jai Lava Kusa is a 2017 Indian Telugu-language action film written and directed by K. S. Ravindra and produced by Nandamuri Kalyan Ram under his banner N. T. R. Arts. The film stars Jr. N.T.R. in a triple role, alongside Raashi Khanna and Nivetha Thomas. The film also features Ronit Roy in his Telugu film debut, Posani Krishna Murali, Pradeep Rawat, Pavitra Lokesh, Puddipedi Sai Kumar, Nassar, Hamsa Nandini, Abhimanyu Singh and Harish Uthaman in the supporting roles.

The film follows identical triplets, Jai, Lava, and Kusa, who get separated at a young age and follow different paths in life. Jai becomes an evil criminal named Ravana, Kusa becomes a small-time crook and Lava becomes a bank manager. Jai, the eldest of identical triplets was sidelined at a very young age due to stammering. He then develops a hatred for his younger brothers and creates havoc in their lives as they all reunite as adults.

The film was launched formally on 10 February 2017, whereas the commencement of principal photography took place the very same day. The shooting took place on Hyderabad, excluding for few scenes shot at Pune, and was wrapped up in September 2017. The film score and soundtrack were composed by Devi Sri Prasad, with cinematography by Chota K. Naidu and editing by Kotagiri Venkateshwara Rao and Thammi Raju.

The film was released on 4000 screens, during the first day of the Navratri season on 21 September 2017. The film received mixed reviews from critics, with Jr. NTR's performance in the triple role getting praise, whereas the writing received criticism. The film collected over 130 crore worldwide and was successful at the box office. It was screened in Bucheon International Fantastic Film Festival in Category of "Best of Asia" in South Korea.

Plot 
 
Identical triplets Jai, Lava, and Kusa are being taken care of by their maternal uncle. Jai, who is fond of his brothers, always gets beaten by his maternal uncle, who shows partiality to only Lava and Kusa due to Jai's battarism. They have different personalities and seek a humble life through stage drama performances. The maternal uncle allowed only Lava and Kusa to act in drama performances, while Jai is not allowed due to his stammering disability, although Jai has a talent for speech delivery and also in his way of acting. Lava and Kusa also started sidelining and humiliating Jai. Even though Lava and Kusa tried to see Jai at their mother's death, the person who loved Jai a lot at that time is Jai's mother. An instigated and humiliated Jai later sets the drama stage on fire and flees.

After 20 years, all three brothers have become adults. They have separated, they are scattered and seek their own lives in different places. Kusa, an expert mugger with a happy-go-lucky attitude who does anything with money, mugs a huge amount of money to fly to the United States, but the plan eventually backfires as the money becomes worthless due to demonetization. He happens to meet his twin brother Lava, a bank manager who adheres to his principles and runs an ethical life. Lava is an example of goodness and gets entangled in many problems with his life because of it, with the fear of losing his job, he gives a loan for land to build a lake but the buyer cheats on Lava because the buyer actually used the loan to build a beer shop. And his love, Priya, his marriage broker whom he had fallen in love with when his marriage was fixed and he realized his love towards her when she did not talk, meet or see him. Kusa hatches a plan to go to the bank and impersonate Lava, while Lava tries to make Priya, whose marriage was fixed, fall for him. He says that she too loves him but does not accept him because of her family, and she never said that she does not love him and only says to go. Priya soon accepts his love. However, Kusa cheats on Lava and runs away with the money.

Priya disappears, and her father files a kidnap case on Lava because her younger sister claims that she saw Lava kidnap Priya and run away. Priya's father, sister, and a police officer arrive at Lava's house. Lava swears that he did not kidnap Priya. He then receives a call from a colleague, V. A. Rajini, at his bank. She says that there is footage of him stealing money in the bank's locker room. Lava, realizing that Kusa had cheated him, asks the police officer to find Kusa. Kusa is already captured by the police officer and is tied up inside a truck, where Lava and the police officer go. Lava confronts Kusa and asks him about the whereabouts of Priya. Kusa says that he did not kidnap Priya but did take the money. Lava and Kusa venture that if both of them are alive, Jai may also be. The police officer reveals his identity as Kaakha, who is Jai's mentor, and says that Jai's name is not Jai but Ravan. He pretends to arrest them so that he can bring Lava and Kusa to Ravan (Jai).

Kaakha narrates the story about Jai after the fire accident. He says that Ravana (Jai) actually started the fire on purpose and then fled to a dangerous town ruled by gangsters in which Kaakha met Jai and raised him as his own under the name Ravana. Ravana is now a powerful and ruthless dictator who now controls large-scale organized crime and mining in Odisha. Ravana (Jai) was trying to gain a seat in national politics to establish his influence all over the nation and began to campaign for elections, but his anger made him an enemy to the public. He has brought them to his house to use Lava and his kindness to woo the people into voting for Ravana (Jai). Kaakha also tells that Ravana learned the weaknesses of both Lava and Kusa and kidnapped Priya and stole the money, respectively. After knowing the truth about Ravan (Jai), Lava and Kusa are taken to Ravan (Jai)'s house. Ravana (Jai) shows Lava and Kusa Priya and the money, respectively. Ravana (Jai) tells Lava his role and Kusa that he has to love Simran, a woman who hates Ravana. Ravana (Jai) also says that they have to change their outfits like him and follow his mentor Kaakha. An empathetic Lava realizes his mistake in his childhood and tries to change Ravana to Jai, with the help of Priya, while Kusa tries to escape from Ravana. Meanwhile, Lava succeeds by gaining the love of the public while impersonating Ravana (Jai). Kusa meets Simran, who is trying to take revenge on Ravana for her brother's death, he used to work for Ravana (Jai) but ended up getting killed by Ravana's enemies.

Kusa makes a deal with Simran that she has to act like Ravana's lover so that Kusa can get his money back and Simran can take her revenge on Ravana (Jai). Kusa tells the truth to Lava and Priya about his deal with Simran. Ravana (Jai) overhears the plan and angrily tries to kill Lava and Kusa. Lava begs Ravana (Jai) to leave Kusa. Just then, he receives a call in which he is told that he is the frontrunner for winning the election and will soon become the central minister. Lava and Kusa hatch a plan to bring their brother back with them. They do a play in which emotional breakdowns occur in trying to convince Ravan (Jai) to be their brother again. Ravana (Jai), overcome with emotion, storms out. Later, it is known that Ravana is secretly trying to kill his brothers. The next day, Lava and Kusa drive a car that has a bomb attached to it. After they leave, Ravana (Jai) reveals his plan to kill Lava and Kusa. The uncle begs Ravana (Jai) to save Lava and Kusa, but Ravana (Jai) does not listen. Then, the uncle asks Kaakha to tell Ravana (Jai) to not kill Lava and Kusa. Kaakha learns that he told Kusa this, thinking that he was Ravana (Jai). Kusa tells the plan to Lava while they are driving, and they understand Ravana (Jai) and decide to die.

Sarkar, who is seeking to take revenge on Ravan (Jai) for his win in the election, stops the car. Sarkar thinks that there are only twins and says that whoever reveals their identity as Ravan (Jai) will be killed and the other will be spared. Both Lava and Kusa pretend to be Ravana (Jai), and in frustration, Sarkar shoots Lava. As Kusa is screaming Lava's name after he is shot, Sarkar thinks that Kusa is actually Ravana if the person that he just shot is Lava. A fight ensues to try and kill them both. Ravana arrives, saving both Lava and Kusa. However, in the ensuing fight he is gravely injured, yet is successful in killing Sarkar. Jai conveys his affection to his brothers before succumbing to his injuries.

Cast

Production

Development

After the success of Janatha Garage (2016), N. T. Rama Rao Jr., signed his next project tentatively titled #NTR27, under the direction of screenwriter Vakkantham Vamsi, marking his debut as a film director and to be produced by his family banner N. T. R. Arts. Although the project was eventually announced on 20 May 2016 (which coincided with Jr. NTR's birthday), in September 2016, sources stated that the project was shelved after the actor was not satisfied with the script. In October 2016, reports had stated that Anil Ravipudi will direct #NTR27, as he was keen to direct Jr. NTR. A Behindwoods article report stated that he had earlier discussed a story in which NTR was to play a blind person which didn't work out, but the actor seemed keen to work with Anil and asked him to come up with another script, for which he immediately came up with a new idea. However, on 26 December 2016, Nandamuri Kalyan Ram took to Twitter to announce that #NTR27 will be directed by K. S. Ravindra. Kalyan Ram stated that he will produce the film under the home banner N. T. R. Arts, which will be made on a huge scale, and he also planned to hire top technicians in order to get very best product in technical standards and production values.

Casting
In February 2017, Raashi Khanna was signed to play the lead actress opposite Jr. NTR and a source revealed that her role will have huge importance in the film. On 25 March 2017, Hamsa Nandini was signed to play a cameo appearance in the film, whereas the same month, Nivetha Thomas of Gentleman fame was signed to play the second female lead. Samantha Akkineni was initially added to the cast as one of the three female leads, and reports stated that she will play a negative role, although she turned down the offer. On 21 April 2017, Nanditha Raj was added to the cast to play a special cameo in the film. Priyadarshi Pullikonda confirmed his inclusion in the film and stated that he shot for three days.

In April 2017, the makers decided to rope in Kannada actor Duniya Vijay, as the main antagonist, and offered a call sheet to complete his portions with in 15 days. While the actor was banned by the Karnataka Film Chamber of Commerce, due to the freak accident held at the sets of Maasthi Gudi (2017) claimed the lives of two stuntmen. The makers hired Bollywood actor Ronit Roy to play the antagonist, marking his debut in Telugu film industry.

Crew 
The team initially hired C. K. Muraleedharan to handle the cinematography for the film, however due to creative differences, the makers replaced him with Chota K. Naidu after Muraleedharaan opted out of the project. Devi Sri Prasad was hired to score the music, while A. S. Prakash was assigned as the art director.

In April 2017, the production house announced that the Hollywood prosthetics and Legacy Effects expert Vance Hartwell who earlier worked in movies like Lord of the Rings trilogy, Enthiran (2010), Iron Man (2008) and Shutter Island (2010), was signed to take care of NTR's look in the movie, and was flown down from Los Angeles to take the measurement for a facial mask, in which NTR would play three characters in the film. Anil Paduri of Advitha Creative Studios was hired as the visual effects supervisor.

Filming
The film was formally launched in Hyderabad on 10 February 2017, at the new office of N. T. R. Arts. The ceremony was attended by Nandamuri Harikrishna, Nandamuri Ramakrishna, V.V. Vinayak, Dil Raju, Shirish, B. V. S. N. Prasad, Yalamanchili Ravi, Kilaru Sitish, S. Radha Krishna, Suryadevara Naga Vamsi and others. The honorary clap was given by Jr. NTR while the camera was switched on by Nandamuri Harikrishna . Director V.V. Vinayak directed the first shot, which was picturised on the photos of deities.

Principal photography began in February 2017 in Hyderabad while Jr. NTR joined the sets in the mid of March. A wedding scene between the lead pair NTR and Raashi Khanna was picturized in the surrounding area of Chilkur. Actor Priyadarshi also joined this shoot. Nandamuri Harikrishna, father of Jr. NTR and Kalyan Ram, visited the shooting spot in latter half of March and a picture of him on the sets revealed that one of the characters played by Jr. NTR is a bank manager named "N. Lava Kumar". The team spent  to erect a massive set at Ramoji Film City where a major portion of filming took place. Bollywood actor Ronit Roy joined the shoot in the mid June 2017 and some action sequences were shot in a stone quarry in Hyderabad.

The shooting of the film got further delayed, after Jr. NTR was hired to host for the Telugu version of Bigg Boss Season 1 for Star Maa. The film's second schedule in Pune was held on 26 July 2017, were a couple of songs and scenes were shot accordingly, which was expected to take place for 20 days. On the first day of the schedule, Tarak changed 42 different costumes for 13 scenes, all being shot in a single day, which impressed the film's crew members. The film's major portion of shooting was completed on 15 August, excluding for three songs, with NTR started dubbing for his portions ofn 22 August. On 28 August, Tamannah was hired for an item number, which was shot in a single day. The shooting finished in September 2017.

Music 

The film's music is composed by Devi Sri Prasad, with lyrics written by Chandrabose and Ramajogayya Sastry. Chandrabose penned the song "Ravana" in 90 minutes. Originally planned for a grand audio launch on 23 July 2017, the event was cancelled due to the unpleasant weather prevailing in Hyderabad. The album was directly released online on 7 August 2017, at a formal press meet held in Hyderabad, with the film's cast and crew being present. The audio jukebox was unveiled by Lahari Music, which bought the film's audio rights, through its official YouTube channel and received positive response, with the jukebox crossing 1 million views within 12 hours of its release.

Mridula Ramadugu of Firstpost stated "The Jai Lava Kusa album is an ode to Ravana. Except for one track, most tunes have a Ravana theme to them and the Devi Sri Prasad (DSP) album has most elements except one." Indiaglitz stated "The album is surely not a one-man show.  It's a five-men show – DSP, Chandrabose, Jai, Lava and Kusa." 123Telugu reviewed as "Jai Lava Kusa's audio is a decent outing for Devi Sri Prasad".

Release
Initially planned for a Dusshera release, Jai Lava Kusa was scheduled for a worldwide theatrical release ahead of the Dusshera festival, on 21 September 2017, and also coinciding with the day of Navratri. The film was released in more than 4000 screens, marking it the second highest release for a Telugu film after Baahubali 2: The Conclusion, and also the biggest release in Jr. NTR's career. The film opened in 975 screens in Andhra Pradesh and Telangana, 225 screens in Karnataka and other parts of India, 190 screens in the US and 162 screens in the UK, Gulf, Australia, Germany and other international markets. The film released earlier on United States on 20 September, where it was premiered in more than 70 locations.

Marketing 
On the occasion of Sri Rama Navami (5 April 2017), the makers announced the title of the movie as Jai Lava Kusa.

The pre-release event was held on 3 September 2017, at a grand ceremony held at Shilpakala Vedika in Hyderabad. The film's theatrical trailer was released on the same day, and crossed 3 million views within 24 hours.

Pre-release revenue 
In the Uttar Andhra region, the film made a business of  before release. Thus the film earned , from the theatrical rights in Andhra Pradesh and Telangana. The distribution rights were not finalized in Vizag, as there were no buyers for the film.

Controversies 
In the end of June 2017, a couple of leaked stills and a teaser from the movie surfaced online and went viral on the internet. The production house was upset over the matter and requested the fans not to share them on the social media. Some of the culprits were later identified and arrested. It was later revealed that the teaser was not the finalized one and it was just a rough cut. A man named Ganesh was arrested on the charges of leaking the teaser online. Producer Kalyan Ram approached the cybercrime department and lodged a complaint over this issue.

In July 2017, there were reports claimed that the script of the film was stolen from director Puri Jagannadh. It was initially proposed that Puri and Jr NTR were supposed to do a film together and had discussed a similar character during their meeting last December. While the film was expected to be made on a huge scale the makers, but it didn't materialise following certain creative differences, as Jr. NTR had liked the script, but wanted a few changes to the background story, whereas Puri didn't agree with him and said. A source from the film's team claimed that, "When Puri watched the first teaser of the film, which released on 6 July 2017, he realised that the Jai's characterisation is exactly what he had proposed to Jr NTR for their film. Since his main plot has already been stolen, Puri cannot go ahead and make the film. He will have to scrap the story, which was supposed to translate into a 100 crore film."

Home media 
The film had a television premiere on 13 January 2018, ahead of Sankranthi, and registered a TRP rating of 17.7 in the first premiere. The Hindi dubbed version titled The Power of 3 - Jai Luv Kush was premiered on Zee Cinema on 13 May 2018.

Reception

Critical reception 
The film opened to mixed response from critics. Sridhar Adivi of The Times of India gave 3.5 out of 5 stars stating "Jai Lava Kusa has everything that one expects in a star film — comedy, action, drama, romance, etc. Box-office revenues apart, Jr NTR has once again proved with this film what a fine actor he is." Srivatsan of India Today gave the film a rating of 3 out of 5 and stated "Jai Lava Kusa is yet another star vehicle that begins on a rather high note." Sangeetha Devi Dundoo of The Hindu stated "Jai Lava Kusa gets predictable and even melodramatic, but NTR holds it together with a class act." 123Telugu gave 3.25 out of 5 stating "Jai Lava Kusa is NTR's one-man show".

Writing for The Indian Express, Manoj Kumar R. gave 3 out of 5 stating "First and major reason not to give Jai Lava Kusa a miss this weekend is the fact that for the first time fans will get to see Jr NTR play a triple role. Jr NTR has excelled at performing all three roles, while effortlessly switching between Jai, Lava and Kusa showing the stark contract in their characters." Hemanth Kumar of Firstpost gave 3 out of 5 stating "There are, in fact, three reasons to watch the film: NTR, NTR, NTR. Perhaps there's no other film in recent times which celebrates an actor to this extent, and it expects us to do the same. Because beyond this, nothing else seems to matter." Karthik Keramalu of Hindustan Times gave the film 3 out of 5 and stated "Jai Lava Kusa works when it brings the emotional angle of the brothers to forefront and this is the angle we wish was exploited more effectively."

The New Indian Express gave the film 3 out of 5 stating "Jai Lava Kusa draws its prowess from NTR who pulls off three contrasting roles with great fervour and enthusiasm." Vikram Venkateshwaran of Bloomberg Quint reviewed it as "Jai Lava Kusa, at almost three hours is almost completely devoid of lags, and runs through like a breeze. It's NTR Jr all the way through till the end. And for the price of one ticket, you get three heroes, all fully fleshed out. And that, is one heck of a weekend deal." Sowmya Rajendran of The News Minute reviewed "Jai Lava Kusa is Junior NTR all the way and he lives up to the massive expectations." Suresh Kavirayani of Deccan Chronicle gave 3 out of 5 and stated "Jai Lava Kusa is a good film, conceptually, but the director has only been partially successful in executing his vision. Jr NTR's powerful performances make this film worth a watch for his fans."

In contrast, Behindwoods gave the film a rating of 2.25 out of 5 stating "Tarak's supreme efforts gone in vain!!! A missed opportunity". Indiaglitz gave the film 2.75 out of 5 and stated "JLK is NTR's show, lock, stock, and barrel.  The story line is decent.  The screenplay has its share of flaws and the first half is underwhelming.  The climax fight should have been much better.  The emotional content (read the brotherly sentiment) could help the film sail through." Sify gave 2.75 out of 5 stating "Jai Lava Kusa is Jr NTR's show totally from the first episode to the last scene. In particularly he has shown his acting caliber once again in the role of Jai. But the movie has uneven narration - some parts are good, some are cliched."

Box office

India 
Jai Lava Kusa earned ₹32.10 crore in the opening day from the Telugu states, and collected ₹46.6 crore worldwide. The film earned ₹25 crore in the second day, taking its total collections up to second day, to ₹71 crore. The film's opening weekend collection stood at ₹90.3 crore. At the sixth day, the film collected more than ₹103 crore. According to The Times of India, the film's grossed ₹129 crore in two weeks. The film earned a share of ₹57.79 crore to its distributors across Telugu states. The film completed 50-day theatrical run in 12 centres.

Overseas 
Jai Lava Kusa earned $589,000 from its premiere shows in the United States, breaking the opening record of Janatha Garage (2016), which earned $584,000. As of 2 October, the film earned $1.5 million at the US box office.

Notes

References

External links

2017 films
2017 action drama films
2017 masala films
Films scored by Devi Sri Prasad
Indian action drama films
Films shot in Hyderabad, India
2010s Telugu-language films
Twins in Indian films
Films shot at Ramoji Film City